The work of the Helmholtz Centre for Environmental Research – UFZ (prior to 28 November 2006  UFZ-Umweltforschungszentrum Leipzig-Halle GmbH) covers both basic research and applied research.

The UFZ was established on 12 December 1991. The Centre commenced its research activities on 2 January 1992. The UFZ has locations in Leipzig, Halle and Magdeburg in Germany. In addition, it operates a experimental station in Bad Lauchstädt. The UFZ employs a total of about 1,200 employees (as of 2021).

The UFZ has been operating KUBUS, a modern communications and event venue in Leipzig, since 2004. KUBUS has flexible event spaces in a range of sizes and accommodates up to 550 people.

Research areas 

As an international competence centre for environmental sciences, the UFZ investigates interrelationships between humans and nature under the influence of global change. The research activities of UFZ scientists focus on the terrestrial environment – on densely populated urban and industrial conurbations, on agricultural landscapes and near-natural landscapes. They examine issues relating to future land use, the preservation of biological diversity and of ecosystem services, the sustainable management of soil and water resources and the effect of chemicals on humans and the environment – from the level of single cells and organisms up to the scale of regions.

The work of the UFZ is characterised by integrated environmental research that overcomes disciplinary boundaries between the natural and social sciences (interdisciplinarity) and brings together decision-makers from business, government and society (transdisciplinarity). Major scientific infrastructures such as climate and land-use experiments (e.g., GCEF Global Change Experimental Facility, ProVis Centre for the visualisation of biochemical processes at cellular level), platforms and technologies for environmental monitoring (e.g. TERENO terrestrial environmental observatories ), modelling and visualisation (e.g., TESSIN/VisLab Terrestrial Environmental System Simulation & Integration Network) have been or are being initiated, developed and used as part of cooperation arrangements and networks at national and international level.

The goal of UFZ research is to identify ways in which fundamental natural resources can be used sustainably for the well-being of humans and the environment.

Research organisation 

The integrated environmental research carried out by the UFZ is organised into six topic areas. Topic areas 1–4 address core topics; topic areas 5 and 6 comprise cross-sectional competences:

These topic areas have been developed by the UFZ in response to challenges facing society in times of global change: climate change, land-use change, population growth, societies working under conditions of scarcity, globalisation, urbanisation, decline in biodiversity, rising energy and food demands, rising quantity and variety of chemicals impacting people and the environment, new patterns in national and global governance.

A total of 38 method-oriented departments are assigned to the six strategic topic areas. The large number of departments shows the wide subject range and diversity of research at the UFZ.

Member, cooperation arrangements, networks, certifications 

The UFZ is a member of the Helmholtz Association of German Research Centres. Nineteen natural/engineering sciences and medical/biological research centres with about 42,000 employees and an annual budget of over 4.9 billion euros came together to create the association. The UFZ carries out its research in one of six research fields of the Helmholtz Association: Earth and Environment

The UFZ cooperates and works with a large number of government agencies, research facilities and organisations at a national and international level (including UNEP, EU, Intergovernmental Panel on Climate Change (IPCC), Intergovernmental Science-Policy Platform on Biodiversity and Ecosystem Services (IPBES), the Umweltbundesamt (UBA), the Federal Institute for Risk Assessment (BfR), and the Federal Agency for Nature Conservation (BfN)).

UFZ is a member of PEER (Partnership for European Environmental Research). PEER is a network of eight European environmental research centres, and was established in 2001. Over 5,000 people are employed in PEER centres. The total budget of all eight centres is around €430 million per year. By carrying out joint research projects and fostering cooperation between European and international researchers, PEER aims to contribute to the strengthening of environmental research and its role at the European level.

The UFZ, together with the universities of Leipzig, Halle-Wittenberg and Jena and other research facilities, is a cooperation partner of the German Centre for Integrative Biodiversity Research (iDiv), which was established in 2012. iDiv is based in Leipzig and is funded by the Deutsche Forschungsgemeinschaft (DFG, German Research Foundation).

The UFZ has been accredited under EMAS (Eco-Management and Audit System) since 2005. It has been certified under the “berufundfamilie” (job and family) audit since 2014.

Funding 
The basic funding for the UFZ is provided by the Federal Republic of Germany (90%) and the Federal States of Saxony and Saxony-Anhalt (5% each) to a total of about €80.8 million. The total budget including third-party funds and other income is about €121 million (as of 2021).

Publications 
The UFZ publishes a series of brochures, research papers and other publications. An annual report on the work of the Centre is published each year. An overview of publications can be found on the UFZ website.

References

External links 
Helmholtz Centre for Environmental Research - UFZ

Research institutes in Germany
Environmental research institutes
Ecology organizations